Chacao may refer to the following articles:

Chacao Municipality - a municipality of Caracas, Venezuela
Teatro Municipal de Chacao, Caracas Venezuela
Chacao station, a station of Caracas Metro
Chacao, Chile, a village in northern Chiloé Island
Chacao Channel, a channel separating Chiloé Island from the mainland
Chacao Channel bridge
Deportivo Chacao F.C., a former Venezuelan football club (soccer team)
Chacao (cacique), a Venezuelan cacique from the 16th century
Chacao Indian
 Cunco people of the Chiloé Archipeligo in southern Chile